Hope Mills Historic District is a national historic district located at Hope Mills, Cumberland County, North Carolina.  It encompasses 61 contributing buildings and 3 contributing sites in the central business district of Hope Mills.  Ii includes industrial, commercial, religious, and residential buildings and includes notable examples of Federal and Late Victorian style architecture.  Notable buildings include the (former) Hope Mills Manufacturing Company buildings, Rockfish Manufacturing Company, Colin MacRae House (c. 1828), Christ Episcopal Church, Lebanon Masonic Lodge No. 391, and Alice L. Gilbert Store.

It was listed on the National Register of Historic Places in 1985.

References

Historic districts on the National Register of Historic Places in North Carolina
Federal architecture in North Carolina
Victorian architecture in North Carolina
Buildings and structures in Cumberland County, North Carolina
National Register of Historic Places in Cumberland County, North Carolina